G protein-coupled receptor 15 is a protein that in humans is encoded by the GPR15 gene.

GPR15 is a class A orphan G protein-coupled receptor (heterotrimeric guanine nucleotide-binding protein, GPCR). The GPR15 gene is localized at chromosome 3q11.2-q13.1. It is found in epithelial cells, synovial macrophages, endothelial cells  and  lymphocytes especially T cells. 
From the mRNA sequence a 40.8 kD molecular weight of GPR15 is proposed. In an epithelial tumour cell line (HT-29), however, a 36 kD band, composed of GPR15 and galactosyl ceramide, was detected.  Protein expression in lymphocytes is strongly associated with hypomethylation of its gene.

Tissue distribution 
High gene expression was described for colonic mucosa, small bowel mucosa, liver and spleen. Moderate gene expression was found in blood, lymph node, thymus, testis and prostate.  In peripheral blood, GPR15 is mainly found on T cells, especially on CD4+ T helper cells, and less prominent on B cells. 
By immunohistochemistry GPR15 is found specifically in glandular cells of the stomach, α-cells of islet of Langerhans in pancreas, surface epithelium of small intestine and colon, hepatocytes in liver, tubular epithelium of the kidney and in diverse tumour tissues such as glioblastoma, melanoma, small cell lung carcinoma or colon carcinoma.

Function 
The overall physiological role remains elusive. It seems to play a role in homing of single T cell types to the colon. In human, GPR15 controls together with α4β7-integrin the homing of effector T cells to the inflamed gut of ulcerative colitis.  With respect to the homing of GPR15-expressing immune cells to the colon there are divergent mechanisms between human and rodents like mouse.

Ligands 
There are at least two endogenous ligand found recently. One ligand encoded by the human gene C10orf99 was identified as a robust marker for psoriasis whose abundance decreased after therapeutic treatment with anti-interleukin-17 antibody. Transcripts of C10orf99 are abundant in cervix and colon. It is currently unknown whether C10orf99 causes disease symptoms or is the consequence of a disturbed epithelial barrier. It does not act as a chemotactic agent but rather decrease T cell migration suggesting a mechanism of heterologous receptor desensitization.  
The second ligand is a fragment of thrombomodulin exerting anti-inflammatory function in mice.

Clinical significance 
Human GPR15 was originally cloned as a co-receptor for HIV or the simian immunodeficiency virus.  HIV-induced activation of GPR15 in enterocytes seems to cause HIV enteropathy accompanied with diarrhea and lipid malabsorption.  
In inflammatory bowel diseases (IBD) such as Crohn’s disease and ulcerative colitis the proportion of GPR15-expressing cells among regulatory T cells is slightly increased in peripheral blood.  In mouse, GPR15-deficient mice were prone to develop severe large intestine inflammation, which was rescued by the transfer of GPR15-sufficient T regs.

Lifestyle 
Chronic tobacco smoking is a very strong inducer of GPR15-expressing T cells in peripheral blood. Although the proportion of GPR15-expressing cells among T-cells in peripheral blood is a high sensitive and specific biomarker for chronic tobacco smoking  it does not indicate a disturbed homeostasis in the lung.

References

Further reading 

 
 
 
 
 
 
 
 

G protein-coupled receptors